In Concert #$%*!? is the first of the Filipino trio Apo Hiking Society. It is a 13-track live album released in 1974 by Sunshine Records.

Track listing
Welcome Talk (0:10)
Come Saturday Morning Without Her (Medley) (3:03)
Your Mother Should Know (5:23)
Titot (0:36)
Be Kind To Me (2:59)
Audience Participation (1:29)
See Yourself (3:40)
Otis Elevator (3:08)
My Sweet Lord (Gag) (2:14)
Look What We've Done To Your Song (Medley) (4:49)
New Day (4:28)
Sitsiritsit Alibangbang (Gag) (4:08)
Now That It's Over and Done (3:27)

References

APO Hiking Society albums
1974 live albums